Herrenhausen Palace (German: Schloss Herrenhausen) is a former royal summer residence of the House of Hanover in the Herrenhausen district of the German city of Hanover. It is the centerpiece of Herrenhausen Gardens.

The original palace was destroyed by a British bombing raid in 1943 and reconstructed between 2009 and 2013. Today it houses a museum, a division of the Historisches Museum Hannover, and exhibition space.

History
Originally a manor house of 1640, the building was enlarged in phases from 1676, and served as a summer retreat, located only a few kilometers outside the city from the central Leineschloss. In 1683 Sophia of Hanover commissioned the French gardener Martin Charbonnier to enlarge the garden in the manner of Versailles to form the 50 hectare "Großer Garten". Sophia's husband, Ernest Augustus, Elector of Brunswick-Lüneburg, planned its replacement with a large baroque palace, and began construction with the "Galerie", but their son, elector George Louis, who in 1714 succeeded to the British throne as King George I, gave up the palace building project and concentrated on adding water features to the garden.

The next elector, George II of Great Britain, planned again for a new palace in better proportion with the "Großer Garten", but never realized it. His successor George III, who never visited Herrenhausen, had the palace modernised in neoclassical style by Georg Ludwig Friedrich Laves.

During World War II Herrenhausen Palace suffered immense damage in a  British bombing raid on 18 October 1943.

The ruins of the palace were almost completely torn down after the war; the outside staircase once leading up to the entrance was salvaged from the debris and moved next to the Orangerie building where it can be seen today. Prince Ernest Augustus of Hanover sold his remaining property at Herrenhausen Gardens in 1961, but kept the nearby Princely House, a small palace built in 1720 by George I for his daughter Anna Louise. It is now his grandson Ernest Augustus's private home, along with Marienburg Castle.

In 2009, the city of Hanover took the decision to rebuild the palace. The Volkswagen Foundation received the plot and sponsored the reconstruction. Following extensive restoration work, the palace was reopened on 18 January 2013 in a ceremony attended by Princesses Beatrice and Eugenie of York, and Prince Ernst August of Hanover.

The reconstructed baroque palace houses the Museum Schloss Herrenhausen with a cafeteria and a bookshop, as well as exhibition and meeting spaces sponsored by the Volkswagen Foundation.

Gardens

The palace's extensive gardens extending beyond the original "Großer Garten" are an important example of baroque and later garden design and contain many significant period garden buildings. The gardens were reinstated following major damage in World War II, and became an important leisure resource for the city of Hanover, with new additions including an aquarium.

Births, deaths and burials
King George II of Great Britain was born in Herrenhausen Palace in 1683. Three of his daughters were born there:
 Anne, Princess Royal and Princess of Orange
 Princess Amelia of Great Britain
 Princess Caroline of Great Britain

Ernest Augustus, Elector of Brunswick-Lüneburg, George II's grandfather, died in Herrenhausen Palace in 1698.

After World War II the remains of King George I of Great Britain along with his parents' were removed from the chapel of Leineschloss in Hanover and reinterred in the 19th-century "Welfenmausoleum" of Ernest Augustus, King of Hanover, in the "Berggarten" at Herrenhausen.

See also
 Burial places of British royalty
 House of Welf (Guelph)
 List of castles and palaces in Lower Saxony

References

External links

Geography of Hanover
Museums in Lower Saxony
Palaces in Lower Saxony
Buildings and structures in Hanover
Tourist attractions in Hanover
Culture of Lower Saxony